Brown Adam is Child ballad 98.

Synopsis

Brown Adam, a smith, is exiled from his family.  He builds a house in the woods for himself and his lady.  One day, he goes hunting.  He returns home to find his lady with a knight—or king's son—trying to persuade her to leave Brown Adam.  She refuses many rich bribes; she will stay with Brown Adam.  When he starts to threaten her, Brown Adam makes himself known and maims him, cutting off his hand.

References

External links
Brown Adam

Child Ballads
Year of song unknown
Songwriter unknown